Apollo Recordings was a British dance music label established in 2006 by Matt Jagger.  It was an imprint of Universal-Island Records, part of the Universal Music corporation.

Their first release "Thunder in My Heart Again" by Meck featuring Leo Sayer was a number one hit on the UK Singles Chart in February 2006. Apollo was run in conjunction with the Europa Recordings imprint, but both were closed down by Universal in 2007.

References

British record labels
English electronic dance music record labels